Carl Otto is a blended given name. Notable people known by this name include the following:

Carl Otto Bartning (1909 – 1983), German film editor
Carl Otto Czeschka (1878 – 1960), Austrian painter and graphic designer
Carl Otto Harz (1842 – 1906), German mycologist, pharmacist and botanist
Carl Otto Lampland (1873 – 1951), American astronomer
Carl Otto Lenz (born 1930), German jurist and politician
Carl Otto Løvenskiold (1839 – 1916), Norwegian politician
Carl Otto Løvenskiold (1898–1969), Norwegian landowner and businessperson
Carl Otto Løvenskiold (born 1953), Norwegian landowner and businessperson
Carl Otto Mörner (1781 – 1868), Swedish courtier
Carl Otto Nordensvan (1851 – 1924), Swedish general and military writer
Carl Otto Reventlow (1817-1873), Danish publisher
Carl Otto Rosendahl (1875–1956), American botanist
Carl Otto Svae (1918 – 1977), Norwegian sailor
Carl Otto von Eicken (1873 – 1960), German otorhinolaryngologist
Carl Otto von Madai (1809 – 1850), German professor, politician, and statesman

See also

Carloto
Carlotta (name)
Carlotto (name)
Karl Otto